Afagh is a surname. Notable people with the surname include:

 Behrouz Afagh, Iranian journalist
 Hamed Afagh (born 1983), Iranian basketball player
 Kaveh Afagh (born 1983), Iranian singer, songwriter, arranger, and guitarist

See also
 Afagh (newspaper)
 Afash